Raquel Lebrón (born 12 February 1954) is a Paraguayan harpist. After performing widely in Europe and South America, in 2010 she received a peace prize as an outstanding Paraguayan woman.

Biography

Born in Asunción, Raquel began to study music at the age of seven under Marcial Heffernan Liam Zelaya. She went on to study the harp for 11 years with Santiago Cortesi, María Cristina Gómez and Nicolás Caballero. Lebrón has performed in concerts and recitals in Paraguay, Argentina, Bolivia, Uruguay, Brazil, Canada and Germany. In 1991, she was awarded first prize at the Eisteddfod in Roodepoort, South Africa, for solo folk instrument performance. She played for ARD German Television (1991–92), performing at concerts across Germany. More recent performances have included Hamburg (1995), Berlin (2005) and Heidelberg (2007), as well as Expo '98 in Lisbon, the Paraguayan-Brazilian Cultural Centre in Rio de Janeiro (2000) and the Teatro Colón in Buenos Aires (2002).

Raquel performs regularly in Paraguay, participating in the World Harp Festival since 2008. An elegant performer, she demonstrates the adaptability of the Paraguayan harp to all forms of music.

Awards

In 2010, Lebrón received the award for Outstanding Paraguayan Women from the Women's Federation for World Peace.

Recordings

References

Living people
1954 births
20th-century Paraguayan women
Paraguayan harpists
People from Asunción
20th-century women musicians
21st-century Paraguayan women
21st-century women musicians
20th-century classical musicians
21st-century classical musicians
Paraguayan women musicians
Paraguayan translators